Meike de Vlas (6 September 1942 – 8 October 2022) was a Dutch rower who won a silver medal in the single sculls at the European Championships in 1964. Her husband Hadriaan van Nes and daughter Eeke van Nes (born 1969) are Olympic medalists in rowing.

De Vlas was born on Ameland on 6 September 1942. She died of cancer on 8 October 2022, at the age of 80.

References

1942 births
2022 deaths
Dutch female rowers
Sportspeople from Ameland 
Sportspeople from Zwolle 
European Rowing Championships medalists
21st-century Dutch women
20th-century Dutch women